Major League Baseball on CBS Radio was the de facto title for the CBS Radio Network's coverage of Major League Baseball. Produced by CBS Radio Sports, the program was the official national radio broadcaster for the All-Star Game and the postseason (including the World Series) from 1976 to 1997.

History
Historically, the sports coverage now produced by Westwood One was branded as CBS Radio Sports and, like the news features, associated with the CBS Radio Network; however, after CBS began managing the original Westwood One in the mid-1990s, the sports broadcasts would come under the Westwood One banner (with both identities used in the late 1990s), a practice that would continue even after CBS stopped managing Westwood One in 2007. CBS launched a 24/7 sports radio network, "CBS Sports Radio" in fall 2012 through Cumulus Media Networks, owned by Cumulus Media (Cumulus Media Networks was merged into Westwood One in 2013, following Cumulus' acquisition of Westwood One).

Contracts
CBS first broadcast Major League Baseball in the early days of network radio, sharing World Series coverage with NBC beginning in 1927 and All-Star Game coverage beginning in 1933. NBC, in turn, would have exclusivity for both events from 1957 through 1975.

In , CBS Radio carried Saturday regular-season Brooklyn Dodgers home games played at Ebbets Field, simulcasting the team's local WMGM radio broadcasts with Red Barber and Connie Desmond announcing. The CBS simulcasts, which were sponsored by General Foods, were blacked out in major league cities but otherwise aired nationally.

From –, CBS Radio paid US$75,000 per year for rights to the World Series, All-Star Game, and League Championship Series. In  the network added regular-season Saturday Game of the Week broadcasts.

By , CBS Television would get into the Major League Baseball broadcasting business (having last done so in ). This particular partnership would last through the  season. Meanwhile, CBS Radio would pay Major League Baseball US$50 million for 1990–1993 radio rights to the Game of the Week and Sunday Night Baseball as well as the All-Star Game, League Championship Series, and World Series.

Following the  season, CBS Radio signed a six-year contract worth US$50.5 million. Following the 1994 strike and the dissolving of "The Baseball Network" (a planned six-year-long television joint venture involving ABC, NBC and Major League Baseball), the television contracts had to be realigned. Ultimately, Major League Baseball on CBS Radio would last through the  season before being succeeded by Major League Baseball on ESPN Radio.

The Game of the Week
In , CBS Radio started broadcasting a weekly Game of the Week. CBS Radio usually did two games each Saturday, one on the afternoons and another during the evenings. Typically, CBS' markets aired only the afternoon broadcasts. The games covered varied from the ones NBC-TV were offering at the time to games outside of NBC's sight.

One notable exception was KCBS in San Francisco, which almost always carried the evening games. In , just before the strike, KNBR carried the broadcasts in San Francisco and finally aired some of CBS' afternoon games.

As previously mentioned, CBS Radio would also eventually follow ESPN television's suit, and broadcast Sunday night games (something ESPN started in ). John Rooney and Jerry Coleman usually called these games while Jim Hunter hosted the pregame show entitled Inside Pitch.

CBS Radio's local coverage

CBS Radio was the largest broadcaster of local Major League Baseball broadcasts. In 2005 and 2007 respectively, CBS dropped the St. Louis Cardinals from KMOX and the Pittsburgh Pirates from KDKA, ending two long relationships between the teams and their flagship stations. However, KMOX reacquired the Cardinals' broadcast rights in 2011, and KDKA's FM sister all-sports station acquired the Pirates' broadcast rights in 2012, in addition to New York Yankees games being renewed on WCBS after the conclusion of the 2011 season, they would have the rights until the end of the 2013 season.

CBS's WFAN is the flagship station of the New York Yankees (they had broadcast the Mets until 2014) and WSCR is the flagship station of the Chicago Cubs. In Philadelphia, WPHT, a frequency that had been the longtime home of the Philadelphia Phillies before parting ways after the 2001 season, reacquired the team's broadcast rights in 2005. As of 2012, those games are now simulcast on sister station WIP-FM. KRLD-FM in Dallas was the flagship station for the Texas Rangers before the 2011 season.

In 2015, the Chicago Cubs moved its radio broadcasts to CBS property WBBM (AM) from its longtime home of WGN (AM). That same year, the Baltimore Orioles began its second stint on all-sports WJZ-FM, four years after it was moved back to its traditional home of WBAL (AM). In 2016, the Cubs rights moved to sister station WSCR as part of a pre-arrangement in the 2015 agreement where WSCR would take over airing games after letting the rights to the Chicago White Sox go after the 2015 season (which now broadcast on WGN (AM)).

During the 2010s, at least seven teams were on stations owned by the company: 
Chicago White Sox (WSCR)
Detroit Tigers (WXYT-FM)
New York Mets (WFAN)
New York Yankees (WCBS)
Philadelphia Phillies (WPHT, but expected to move to WIP-FM as of 2012 season)
Pittsburgh Pirates (KDKA-FM as of 2012 season, returning games to CBS Radio, but to a different station than longtime flagship KDKA)
St. Louis Cardinals (KMOX; returned in 2011 after a two-year absence)

In addition, three teams had been on CBS-owned stations until the 2010–11 "hot stove" period:
Baltimore Orioles (left WJZ-FM for WBAL)
Oakland Athletics (left KFRC-FM for KYCY, then for non-owned KBWF/KGMZ just before Opening Day)
Texas Rangers (left KRLD-FM for KESN)

Commentators

The Game of the Week
From –, the two announcers calling the games at hand split play-by-play duties.

The Home Town Inning
The Home Town Inning, traditionally featuring a visiting team announcer calling the top of the fifth with the home team announcer calling the bottom of the fifth, was featured on CBS Radio postseason games from – and on regular season games from –.

Full list of commentators
Play-by-play commentators included:
Sparky Anderson (–) for the World Series
Johnny Bench (–)
Marty Brennaman for the World Series
Jack Buck (–) for the World Series
Joe Buck (–)
Steve Busby (–) 
Gary Cohen (–)
Jerry Coleman (–)
Win Elliot (–) for the World Series
Gene Elston (–)
Steve Garvey (–)
Curt Gowdy (–)
Hank Greenwald
Ernie Harwell (–)
Jim Hunter (–)
Frank Messer (–)
Bob Murphy (–)
Brent Musburger (–)
Lindsey Nelson (–)
Ross Porter (–) for the World Series
John Rooney (–)
Vin Scully (–; –) for the World Series
Jeff Torborg (–) for the World Series
Bill White (–)

Other commentators (roughly in order of first appearance) included: 
Dick Stockton
Howard David
Ted Robinson
Charlie Slowes 
Tom Kelly 
Joel Meyers
Tommy Hutton
Ron Fairly
Joe Torre
Lee Mazzilli
George Grande
Jerry Trupiano – Trupiano called three games on the CBS Radio Game of the Week in 1991
Joe Magrane
Billy Sample
Spencer Ross
Al Downing
Rick Cerone
Steve Mason

All-Star Game commentators

1990s

1980s

1970s

Tie-breaker game commentators

Division Series and League Championship Series commentators

Johnny Bench (–)
Jack Buck (–)
Gary Cohen (League Championship Series: –; 1995-; 1996 American League Division Series (Yankees–Rangers))
Gene Elston (–)
Curt Gowdy (–; ; –)
Ernie Harwell (American League Championship Series: –; –; ; American League Division Series: –)
Ralph Kiner (–)
Hank Greenwald
Harry Kalas
Ned Martin (–)
Denny Matthews
Brent Musburger
John Rooney (League Championship Series: –; –; Division Series: –)
Ross Porter
Jeff Torborg (League Championship Series: –; Division Series: –)
Bill White (–; –; –)

Jim Hunter called the American League Championship Series alongside Johnny Bench from 1990–1992. In , Hunter teamed Ernie Harwell to call the ALCS. In , Hunter called the American League Division Series between the New York Yankees and Texas Rangers with Gary Cohen.

World Series commentators

1990s

1980s

1970s

When CBS Radio took over World Series rights from NBC Radio in 1976, they continued the old practice of having the local team announcers do the play-by-play for the World Series games in the road market of that home team's broadcasters through 1978. Thus, Bill White got call do all three World Series involving the New York Yankees on CBS Radio from 1976–1978 and Ross Porter with the Los Angeles Dodgers in 1977–1978. In addition, CBS Radio used Marty Brennaman in 1976, when his Cincinnati Reds played against White's Yankees. 

In 1977, Bill White did CBS Radio play-by-play for the games in Los Angeles while Ross Porter handled the games played in New York. Thus, when White was working on ABC-TV during that series, it was during the home games in a pre/postgame role (White would eventually cover the trophy presentation ceremony for ABC). Likewise, Ross Porter handled White's TV role while in Los Angeles. From 1976–1978, Win Elliot was always in the booth either as a host or color man but never he did play-by-play for CBS Radio's World Series coverage. Elliot was in a sense, the designated "network" participant on the broadcasts since he hosted the CBS Sports Roundup and other events for CBS Radio like horse racing events. Meanwhile, Ralph Kiner served as the pre and postgame host. In New York, the 1977 World Series was carried by two radio stations, WCBS and the Yankees' then flagship station, WMCA. WCMA simply carried the same CBS feed as did WCBS since separate radio broadcasts with the local announcers wouldn't begin until 1984.

In 1979, CBS Radio, following the lead begun by ABC's television coverage in 1977, dropped the usage of the local broadcasters on play-by-play. They stopped using local announcers altogether when Vin Scully began doing the World Series as a CBS employee through 1982. (Beginning in 1981, however, participating teams' flagship radio stations were permitted to produce their own local World Series broadcasts and air them live. The affiliate stations in the teams' radio networks continued to be obligated to carry the CBS Radio broadcasts.)

During the 1980 World Series, thousands of Philadelphia Phillies fans were outraged that they could not hear their local team announcers call the games. They deluged the team, the networks, and the Commissioner's office with angry letters and petitions. The CBS Radio feed could potentially be heard in those markets on another station which held CBS's rights. WPHL did a "re-creation" of the game with Harry Kalas, Richie Ashburn, and Andy Musser using the NBC video, which aired in November along with the National League East division clinching game in Montreal and three games from the NLCS against Houston.

After the  season, Scully left CBS altogether to do baseball play-by-play for NBC on television (a role that he had through the end of the  season). In Vin Scully's absence, came Jack Buck, who would call the World Series for CBS Radio from 1983 through 1989.

In 1985, KMOX, the St. Louis Cardinals' flagship station at the time, simulcast with CBS Radio's World Series coverage involving the Cardinals. That was mainly because Jack Buck had a lengthy career calling Cardinals games for KMOX to go along with his national work for CBS Radio.

In 1990, Buck would move over to CBS-TV to call the World Series and Scully returned to CBS Radio to take his place following NBC's loss of television rights. Scully would continue to call the World Series on through 1997 (CBS' last before the contract moved to ESPN Radio).

World Series moments

1985 World Series
Despite his long and illustrious career, Don Denkinger is probably best remembered for a blown call he made at first base in Game 6 of the 1985 World Series, played on October 26. The St. Louis Cardinals led the Kansas City Royals by 3 games to 2. The Cardinals had taken a 1-0 lead in the 8th inning on a single by little-used backup catcher Brian Harper after pitchers Danny Cox (of the Cardinals) and Charlie Leibrandt (of the Royals) had battled back and forth all game long. Todd Worrell came into the game for the Cardinals in the 9th inning, first facing Jorge Orta, the leadoff batter for the Royals. Orta hit a slow roller to first baseman Jack Clark, who tossed to Worrell covering first base.

Denkinger was the umpire at first base and called Orta safe, even though television replays and photographs clearly showed that he was out by half a step.  The Cardinals argued briefly, but Denkinger refused to reverse it. The Royals went on to win Game 6 by the score of 2-1.

1986 World Series
The following is a word-for-word transcript of Jack Buck and Sparky Anderson's commentary during the final moments of Game 6 of the 1986 World Series:
J = Jack Buck
S = Sparky Anderson

J: Mookie Wilson is the batter...he has a hit...one out of three...a switch hitter, he'll bat left. Moments ago, the Red Sox were one strike away. Now they're one out away. Here's the pitch...and a foul strike one...back into the seats and Wilson wasn't taking. Howard Johnson is on deck, we mentioned earlier he stayed in the game.

S: Mookie's not bashful, he's not afraid to swing this bat. He's not concerned right now...he wants a base hit.

J: Next pitch from Stanley is a ball and it's one and one...they hold against Ray Knight, he is not a threat to steal. The batter is Mookie Wilson, one ball one strike, two on, two out...way high ball two, as Stanley slipped coming of the pitching rubber. The on deck batter is Howard Johnson and this thing, this game has been at the finish line three or four times. 5-4 Boston, bottom half of the tenth inning, 5-4, first and third two out, and a foul puts Boston within a strike of the title again. It evens the count to Mookie Wilson, that ball in on him, two and two.

S: Don't be surprised if you see his palmball right here.

J: First and third. Tying run at third, winning run at first, two out, the pitch! a swing and a...foul tip, he just got a piece of it and that's how close Boston was to nailing it down. A foul by Mookie Wilson keeps him up there. two balls two strikes. The Mets have scored here in the tenth, they trail 5-4 trying to send us into tomorrow night. Here's the pitch! Swing and a foul, back and out of play and Wilson hammered at one outside, in the strike zone I think, stays 2-2. Mitchell the tying run at third, a base hit ties it for New York, a long one could win it, a home run would win it, the pitch! Ball three! Wild pitch! We're gonna be tied! The ball went off the glove of the catcher. We're 5-5 in the bottom of the tenth. Unbelievable, it's 5-5 and now the winning run is at second with two out. A breaking ball handcuffed Gedman, a breaking ball handcuffed the catcher and Mitchell raced home with the tying run and Mookie Wilson could win it here. They have a base open and Howard Johnson up next. That run charged to Schiraldi. The 3-2 pitch on the way, swing and a high pop foul going out of play. And it gives everybody a chance to collect their collective breath as the Mets have scored two here in the tenth after scoring a run in the eighth to pull it out of the bag again.

S: Boy if this don't remind you of that California Angels-Boston series, nothing will...

J: And a full count on Mookie Wilson, he can win it with a hit. Ray Knight is at second base. Here's the pitch! Swing and a foul out of play, and I'll tell you this folks. If the Mets win this tonight, man, there will be no holding them tomorrow, Dennis Boyd or no Dennis Boyd.

S: They'll come out here looking like they're on stilts.

J: It stays three and two, let's look ahead to the Boston eleventh inning. Evans will lead it off. Isn't this unbelievable. A couple of times Boston was a strike away from winning. You remember that little foul tip just before? What did they call it? Wild pitch or passed ball?

S: I think they called it a wild pitch.

J: Wild pitch. Here's the pitch to Mookie Wilson. Winning run at second. Ground ball to first, it is a run...an error! An error by Buckner! The winning run scores! The Mets win it 6 to 5 with three in the tenth! The ball went right through the legs of Buckner and the Mets with two men out and nobody on have scored three times to bring about a seventh game, which will be played here tomorrow night. Folks, it was unbelievable. An error, right through the legs of Buckner. There were two on, nobody out, a single by Carter, a single by Mitchell, a single by Ray Knight, a wild pitch, an error by Buckner. Three in the ninth for the Mets. They've won the game 6-5 and we shall play here... tomorrow night! Well, open up the history book, folks, we've got an entry for you...What do you think, Sparky?

S: I never seen nothing like it. Here you got two out, two run lead, you figure Carter up, he can't even hurt you. He gets a base hit, another base hit, another base hit...wild pitches, ball rolls through the guys legs. I've never seen nothing like it, Jack.

J: It will be Boyd against Darling tomorrow night.

S: Yogi Berra is the greatest human being who ever lived. He said, it's not over 'til it's over.

J: This game is now history and it deserves its own page...

1988 World Series
For CBS Radio's coverage of the 1988 World Series, Jack Buck provided play-by-play while Bill White served as the analyst. This was Buck's call of the final moments of Game 1. It begins here with Buck speculating on what might happen if Kirk Gibson manages to reach base: "... then you would run for Gibson and have Sax batting. But, we have a big 3-2 pitch coming here from Eckersley. Gibson swings, and a fly ball to deep right field! This is gonna be a home run! Unbelievable! A home run for Gibson! And the Dodgers have won the game, 5 to 4; I don't believe what I just saw!"

The last sentence is often remembered and quoted by fans. Buck followed it with, "I don't believe what I just saw! Is this really happening, Bill?"

Moments after Kirk Gibson's home run, Jack Buck told his listeners, "I've seen a lot of dramatic finishes, in a lot of sports, but this one might top almost every other one."

1989 World Series
On October 17, commentators Jack Buck, Johnny Bench and John Rooney, were on hand at San Francisco's Candlestick Park for Game 3 of the World Series between the San Francisco Giants and Oakland Athletics. At 5:04 p.m. local time, the Loma Prieta earthquake hit (and subsequently caused a ten-day delay for the World Series). Unlike ABC-Television (with Al Michaels, Jim Palmer and Tim McCarver calling the action on the TV side), CBS Radio was in a commercial break when the earthquake struck. After the earthquake hit, Jack Buck told the listening audience, "I must say about Johnny Bench, folks, if he moved that fast when he played, he would have never hit into a double play. I never saw anybody move that fast in my life."

1991 World Series
On October 27, Vin Scully, along with Johnny Bench and John Rooney, was on hand for a game considered by fans to be one of the most intense in the sport's history. Game 7 of the already exciting World Series (between the Minnesota Twins and Atlanta Braves) was scoreless going into the ninth inning, and an emotionally drained Scully said, "After eight full innings of play, Atlanta nothing, Minnesota nothing... I think we'll be back in just a moment." In the bottom of the tenth inning, Gene Larkin won the game for the Twins with a high fly-ball into left field (which allowed Dan Gladden to score) off Alejandro Peña.

The following is Scully's description of the final moments of Game 7:

The day prior, this is how Scully described Kirby Puckett's game winning home run to send the 1991 World Series to a seventh and decisive game in the first place:

1996 World Series
During his CBS Radio broadcast in 1996, Vin Scully made another memorable call in the third inning of Game 1, when 19-year-old rookie outfielder Andruw Jones became the first National League player to hit two home runs in his first two at-bats in a World Series.

1997 World Series
For CBS Radio's final World Series to date, the seventh and decisive game between the Florida Marlins and Cleveland Indians went into the bottom of the 11th inning with the score tied 2–2. This is how Vin Scully described the final moments of that game:

Before CBS Radio signed off from their baseball coverage for the final time on October 26, 1997, Vin Scully and Jeff Torborg delivered this final message to listeners:
Vin Scully: Tonight's game sponsored by CBS television, by Countrywide Home Loans, by Horrick, and by the U.S. Army. Our producer Norman Baer, our engineers Stem Gehan and Sam Carroll, our studio coordinator Andrew Holmlund, our PR reference has been John Ralph of the Baseball Hall of Fame, and assisting us in the booth, Dale Torborg. Once again the final score from Miami, the Marlins 3, Cleveland 2. This will be our last broadcast for CBS. Jeff, I must tell you what an absolute delight and pleasure it has been to sit here and share the broadcast with you, you're outstanding.

Jeff Torborg: Vin, coming from you that's a great deal. You are not only a Hall of Fame announcer, you are more than a Hall of Fame person. And I, I respect you so much and so grateful that we have a friendship and have that for a lot of years, thank you.

Scully: If we never work together I will never forget these years and thank you. I'd like to thank John Rooney, who is indeed a part of the group and to our loyal producer Norman Baer, who's done such a great job over the years. And for us that figures to wrap up our World Series work for CBS. So once again the final score, Marlins 3, Cleveland 2. The Marlins are the World Champions. Our congratulations to both teams.

References

External links
 Summer 1997: 75 Years of National Baseball Broadcasts
 MLB Baseball – CBS Sportsline.com
 Voices of The Game
 shop.mlb.com  > Classic Radio Broadcast
shop.mlb.com > Classic Radio Broadcast  > Special Events
 CBS RADIO 1986 WS G6 10th inning
 Audio Recordings – Historic Broadcasts (1960 – Today)
 The Vault Podcasts | MLB.com

CBS Radio
American sports radio programs
1976 radio programme debuts
CBS Radio Sports
1970s American radio programs
1980s American radio programs
1990s American radio programs
CBS Radio programs